The Stampede Wrestling British Commonwealth Mid-Heavyweight Championship was a professional wrestling title for lighter wrestlers in the Canadian promotion Stampede Wrestling. It was created in 1978.

Title history

Combined reigns

References

External links

British Commonwealth Mid-Heavyweight
Mid-Heavyweight wrestling championships
National professional wrestling championships
1978 establishments in Canada